Brothers at War is a 2009 documentary film directed by Jake Rademacher and produced by Rademacher and Norman S. Powell.  The film follows several US soldiers in the Iraq War. The film's executive producers are actor, director, and Presidential Citizens Medal recipient Gary Sinise and Secretary of Defense Medal for Outstanding Public Service recipient David Scantling.   Brothers at War won the Best Documentary Feature Award at the 2008 GI Film Festival.  The film features an original score by Lee Holdridge and an original song--"Brothers in Arms"—by John Ondrasik of Five for Fighting.

Synopsis

Filmmaker Jake Rademacher sets out to understand the motivation, sacrifice and experience of his two younger brothers, Isaac and Joe, serving in Iraq. The film depicts the toll the life-threatening work and separation take on the parents, siblings, wives and children of the soldiers. As the film develops, however, it becomes clear that an underlying motivation for Jake is to prove himself to his brothers, and to himself. Jake thought of joining the military as a youth, but was never a candidate for selection. A year behind him, Isaac was studious, athletic and an Eagle Scout, and was offered an acceptance at West Point. Joe is many years younger than the two older boys, and enlisted. In Iraq Joe performs overwatch duties as a sniper. Though not under his command, Joe ended up serving in the 82nd Airborne Division, the same unit in which Isaac serves as an officer.

The film follows Jake as he arrives in Iraq at Isaac's unit. Jake is a bit of a distraction to Isaac, who assigns him an embed position with one of his units. Jake has to adjust to life in a combat zone, and goes out with reconnaissance troops on the Syrian border and visits sniper "hide sites" in the Sunni Triangle. After a month of fairly safe postings in country Jake comes home. There he realizes what he has collected fails to tell the story he is looking for. He returns to Iraq, where he is embedded with an Iraqi unit whose US military advisors have encountered embeds before and distrust him, calling him 'Johnny Press'. It is with this unit that Rademacher comes under fire, encounters casualties, and develops an appreciation for the commitment and loss. Returning home the second time, Jake has a much better understanding with his two brothers.

Cast
Mahmoud Hamid Ali as himself
Edward Allier as himself
Zach Corke as himself
Danelle Fields as herself
Ben Fisher as himself
Kevin Keniston as himself
Frank McCann as himself
Brandon 'Mongo' Phillips as himself
Claus Rademacher as himself
Isaac Rademacher as himself
Jake Rademacher as himself
Jenny Rademacher as herself
Joseph Rademacher as himself
Robert Smallwood as himself
Kevin Turner as himself

References

External links

 
 
Reviews
 DoD Website
 US Marine Corps Website
 Human Events
 Regular Folks United
 Military Times

2009 films
2009 documentary films
Films shot in Iraq
Documentary films about the Iraq War
American documentary films
Films scored by Lee Holdridge
2000s English-language films
2000s American films